Jennifer Justine Muñoz Velázquez (born 4 November 1996) is an American-born Mexican former professional footballer who played as a midfielder for Liga MX Femenil club América and the Mexico women's national team.

International career
Muñoz made her senior debut for Mexico on 8 March 2020 in a 2–2 friendly draw against Slovakia and scored her first international goal in that match.

References

External links 
 

1996 births
Living people
Citizens of Mexico through descent
Mexican women's footballers
Women's association football midfielders
Women's association football forwards
Club América (women) footballers
Liga MX Femenil players
Mexico women's international footballers
Sportspeople from Montebello, California
Sportspeople from Mission Viejo, California
Soccer players from California
American women's soccer players
New Mexico Lobos women's soccer players
American sportspeople of Mexican descent